Council elections for the City of Preston, Lancashire were held on 6 May 2010. They coincided with the 2010 United Kingdom general election and the other 2010 United Kingdom local elections. Nineteen electoral wards were fought with those councillors elected in the corresponding elections in 2006 defending their seats due to the "in thirds" system employed in Preston local elections.

The previous elections to Preston council occurred in 2008 but due to the "in thirds" system employed by Preston council, councillors are elected for four-year terms. This means gains, losses, and vote share comparisons this year are with those fought in 2006.

Election result

Ward results

References 

2010
2010 English local elections
May 2010 events in the United Kingdom
2010s in Lancashire